Roskilde Festival 2011 was a festival that took place between 30 June and 3 July 2011, with warm-up and camping from 26 June.

The headliners were: Arctic Monkeys (UK), Iron Maiden (UK), Kings of Leon (US), Mastodon (US), M.I.A. (UK), PJ Harvey (UK) & The Strokes (US)

Line Up

Confirmed artists 
The following artists were confirmed to play at the festival:

 1349 (N)
 4 Guys From the Future (DK)
 Acorn Falling (DK)
 Daniel Adams-Ray (S)
 Afrocubism (INT)
 Agent Fresco (ISL)
 Alcoholic Faith Mission (DK)
 Api Uiz (FR)
 Arctic Monkeys (UK)
 Ólöf Arnalds (ISL)
 Atmosphere (US)
 Autopsy (US)
 Awesome Tapes From Africa (US)
 Bad Religion (US)
 Julianna Barwick (US)
 Battlekat (DK)
 Battles (US)
 Be-Being (KOR)
 Beatsteaks (DE)
 Big Boi (US)
 Black Milk (US)
 James Blake (UK)
 Bottled in England (DK)
 Charles Bradley (US)
 Bright Eyes (US)
 Bring Me the Horizon (UK)
 Brothers Grimm (DK)
 Karina Buhr (BRA)
 Calle 13 (PRI)
 Anna Calvi (GB)
 Chancha Via Circuto (ARG)
 Chase & Status (UK)
 Chuckamuck (DE)
 Cody (DK)
 Congotronics vs. Rockers (INT)
 Chris Cunningham (UK)
 Curren$y (US)
 Dãm Funk (US)
 Dark Dark Dark (US)
 De Eneste To (DK)
 De Høje Hæle (DK)
 Deadmau5 (CAN)
 Matthew Dear (US)
 Desolate (DE)
 Destroyer (CAN)
 DJ/Rupture (US)
 DOP (FR)
 Dååth (US) (cancelled)
 Justin Townes Earle (US)
 The Eclectic Moniker (DK)
 Electric Wizard (UK) (replaced Dååth (US))
 Elektro (DK)
 Emma Acs (DK)
 Essence (DK)
 The Ex (NL)
 Eyehategod (US)
 Fally Ipupa (CD)
 Fastpoholmen (DK)
 Foals (UK)
 Frente Cumbiero (COL)
 Frisk Frugt (DK)
 The Gaslamp Killer (US)
 Ghost (S)
 Gold Panda (UK)
 John Grant (US)
 Graveyard (S)
 Hammons, Harrington & Destroy (DK)
 PJ Harvey (GB)
 Honningbarna (N)
 How To Dress Well (US)
 I Was A King (N)
 Iceage (DK)
 Ililta Band (ETH)
 Iron Maiden (UK)
 Nicolas Jaar (US)
 Jackdaw With Crowbar (UK)
 Jagwar Music (TAN)
 Jatoma (DK)
 JUJU (UK/GAM)
 Kemialliset Ystävät (FIN)
 Killing Joke (UK)
 Kings of Leon (US)
 Kirsten & Marie (DK)
 Kitchie Kitche Ki Me O (N)
 Kloster (DK)
 DJ Koze (DE)
 Femi Kuti & Positive Force (NGA)
 Seun Anikulapo Kuti & Egypt 80 (NGA)
 Kylesa (US)
 Little Dragon (S)
 Little Marbles (S)
 L.O.C. (DK)
 Love Shop (DK)
 LukeStar (N)
 Lykke Li (S)
 Magnetic Man (UK)
 La Makina Del Karibe (COL)
 The Malpractice (DK)
 Mastodon (US)
 Messy Shelters (DK)
 M.I.A. (UK)
 My Chemical Romance (US)
 Janelle Monáe (US)
 Munchi (NL)
 Narasirato (SOL)
 Next Life (N)
 Nive Nielsen & The Deer Children (GRL)
 OFWGKTA (US)
 Oh Land (DK)
 Oudaden (MAR)
 Ivo Papasov & His Wedding Band (BG)
 Parkway Drive (AUS)
 Per Vers (DK)
 Portishead (UK)
 Prince Fatty Soundsystem (UK)
 Pulled Apart by Horses (UK)
 Rango (EGY)
 The Raveonettes (DK)
 Reptile Youth (DK)
 Tarrus Riley & The Black Soil Band (JAM)
 Rob Zombie (US)
 Roll The Dice (S)
 Gonga Sain & Mithu Sain (PAK)
 Johan Sara Jr. (N)
 Screaming Females (US)
 Selvhenter (DK)
 Shangaan Electro (ZA)
 Shutka Roma Rap (MKD)
 Soilwork (S)
 Spids Nøgenhat (DK)
 The Strokes (US)
 Surfer Blood (US)
 Svarte Greiner (N)
 Swans (US)
 The Tallest Man On Earth (S)
 Tame Impala (AUS)
 Terror (US)
 This Is Head (S)
 Thulebasen (DK)
 Timbukti & DAMN! (S)
 Tog (N)
 Tremor (ARG)
 Trust (DK)
 Tu Fawning (US)
 TV on the Radio (US)
 Undergang (DK)
 Underøath (US)
 Valby Vokalgruppe (DK)
 Anibal Velasquez Y Los Locos Del Swing (COL)
 Veto (DK)
 Kurt Vile & the Violators (US)
 The Walkmen (US)
 Walls (UK)
 Wang Le (CHN)
 Weekend (US)
 Who Knew (ILS)
 WhoMadeWho (DK)
 Yelle (FR)
 Yemen Blues (ISR)
 Zea (NL)
 Zun Zun Egui (INT)

References

External links
 Roskilde 2011 live report on Prog Sphere

Roskilde Festival by year
2011 in Danish music
2011 music festivals